Sannae-myeon in South Korea may refer to:

Sannae-myeon, Gyeongju in Gyeongsangbuk-do
Sannae-myeon, Miryang in Gyeongsangnam-do
 in Jeongeup in Jeollabuk-do
 in Namwon in Jeollabuk-do

See also 
 List of townships in South Korea